Two-Bit Waltz is a 2014 American comedy, drama film, written and directed by Clara Mamet in her directorial debut. It stars Mamet, Jared Gilman, Rebecca Pidgeon, David Paymer and William H. Macy. The film had its world premiere at the Tribeca Film Festival on April 19, 2014, and was released in a limited release on October 24, 2014, by Monterey Media.

Premise
Maude (Clara Mamet) is suspended from school, loses a friend, has a broken heart, and lack of inspiration for her novel leads to her downfall.

Cast
 Clara Mamet as Maude
 Jared Gilman as Bernie
 Rebecca Pidgeon as Anita
 David Paymer as The Lawyer
 William H. Macy as Carl
 Ella Dershowitz as Jenny
 John Pirruccello as The Therapist
 Matt Malloy as Guidance Counselor
 Matt O'Leary as Max
 Jason Pickar as Rabbi

Production
In 2012, an Indiegogo campaign was set up for the film announcing Clara Mamet would direct the film from a screenplay she had written and star with William H. Macy, Jared Gilman, Rebecca Pidgeon and John Pirruccello, with Eric B. Fleischman producing. It was however unsuccessful only making only $10,268 out of a $115,000 goal.

Release
The film had its world premiere at the Tribeca Film Festival on April 19, 2014. Shortly after Monterey Media acquired distribution rights to the film. It was released in a limited release on October 24, 2014.

References

External links
 
 
 
 
 

2014 films
2014 comedy-drama films
American comedy-drama films
American independent films
2014 directorial debut films
2014 independent films
2010s English-language films
2010s American films